Lauri Lassila (born 12 October 1976) is a Finnish freestyle skier. He competed in the men's moguls event at the 1998 Winter Olympics.

Personal life
Lassila is married to Australian freestyle skier and Olympic gold medalist Lydia Lassila. He works as an IT entrepreneur in Melbourne, Australia.

References

1976 births
Living people
Finnish male freestyle skiers
Olympic freestyle skiers of Finland
Freestyle skiers at the 1998 Winter Olympics
Sportspeople from Helsinki
Finnish expatriates in Australia